Timothy A. Lenderking is an American diplomat who was appointed as the first United States Special Envoy for Yemen on February 4, 2021. He is Deputy Assistant Secretary of State for Iran, Iraq, and Regional Multilateral Affairs in the Near East Bureau at the United States State Department.

References

External links

Living people
University of Washington alumni
Wesleyan University alumni
United States Special Envoys
Biden administration personnel
Year of birth missing (living people)
Place of birth missing (living people)